Wang Zifeng (born 12 September 1997) is a Chinese rower. She competed in the women's eight event at the 2020 Summer Olympics.

References

External links
 

1997 births
Living people
Chinese female rowers
Olympic rowers of China
Rowers at the 2020 Summer Olympics
Medalists at the 2020 Summer Olympics
Olympic medalists in rowing
Olympic bronze medalists for China
Place of birth missing (living people)
21st-century Chinese women